Warrenton is an unincorporated community in Johnson Township, Gibson County, Indiana. Warrenton is home to The Log Inn, the oldest restaurant in Indiana. The community is located immediately northeast of the US 41-I-64 interchange.

History
Warrenton was platted in 1840. It was named in honor of Joseph Warren, a patriot in the American Revolutionary War. A post office was established at Warrenton in 1841, and remained in operation until it was discontinued in 1856.

Geography

References

Unincorporated communities in Gibson County, Indiana
Unincorporated communities in Indiana